Vladimir Stepanovich Stogov (November 5, 1930 – May 17, 2005) was a former Russian weightlifter, World champion, and Olympic medalist, who competed for the Soviet Union.

He became World champion in the Bantamweight class five times, in 1955, 1957, 1958, 1959, and 1961, and received a silver medal at the 1956 Summer Olympics in Melbourne.

References

External links

1930 births
2005 deaths
Russian male weightlifters
Soviet male weightlifters
Olympic weightlifters of the Soviet Union
Weightlifters at the 1956 Summer Olympics
Olympic silver medalists for the Soviet Union
Olympic medalists in weightlifting
Medalists at the 1956 Summer Olympics
European Weightlifting Championships medalists
World Weightlifting Championships medalists